Stelis alleyoop  is a species of leach orchid in the family Orchidaceae, native to Colombia. An epiphyte, it is named for Alley Oop, the hairy caveman who is the title character of the Alley Oop comic strip.

References

alleyoop
Endemic orchids of Colombia
Plants described in 2016